Elections to Chichester District Council in West Sussex, United Kingdom were held on 3 May 1979, the same day as the general election.

The whole council was up for election and resulted in a Conservative majority.

Boundary changes
Boundary changes resulted in the creation of three new wards: Chichester North, Selsey North and Selsey South. The number of councillors representing Chichester West and Southbourne were reduced, from 5 to 3 and 4 to 3 respectively. The Selsey ward was abolished.

Election result

|}

Ward results

Notes

References

1976 English local elections
1979
1970s in West Sussex